Persiana Jones is an Italian ska punk band formed in 1988. They have appeared on Italian television numerous times and toured countries like Austria, France, Germany, Netherlands, Slovakia, Spain, Switzerland and the Czech Republic.

External links 
 Persiana Jones Official Website
 interpunk.com

Italian musical groups
Italian punk rock groups